Omar Elba (born September 19, 1983) is an Egyptian-American actor, best known for co-starring alongside Tom Hanks in the movie A Hologram for the King. He also had a recurring role as Mark Green opposite Jessica Biel in the Limetown television series.

In the A24/ Netflix series, Mo, Omar plays Sameer, a character with Autism Spectrum Disorder (ASD) who has trouble fitting in. In preparation for the role, he worked meticulously with a Behavioral Therapist studying specific ASD patients at great length. Omar himself is also a neurodivergent, revealing he was officially diagnosed on the autism spectrum in his late 30s.

Elba also starred, wrote and directed Tim, a Freudian short film about the Ego, Id and Superego. In preparation for the 2 main roles, he transformed his body twice by gaining 20 pounds of fat to play Tim and then losing the weight and gaining 10 pounds of muscle to play Tim's Ego. For the physical transformation between both characters to take place, the two performances, Tim and Tim's Ego, were shot one year apart, respectively. In the film, both characters, Tim (an overweight, balding codependent) and Tim's Ego (his better looking, more assertive counterpart), are seen interacting onscreen simultaneously.

References

External links 
 

1983 births
Living people
American people of Egyptian descent
American male film actors
Egyptian male film actors
Actors with autism